Aaron Gideon Parnas is an American lawyer and democratic activist. Parnas is the son of Lev Parnas, known for his role in the Trump-administration Trump–Ukraine scandal. Parnas, who was once a staunch Republican and supporter of President Donald Trump, has since become an activist in support of the Democratic Party. 

During the 2022 Russian invasion of Ukraine, Parnas became a pro-Ukrainian TikToker. Parnas works as a securities litigation attorney at a law firm in Washington, D.C.

Early life 
Aaron Parnas is the son of Lev Parnas. Parnas' father was a close confidante of former New York City Mayor Rudy Giuliani and was convicted and charged for his role in the Trump-Ukraine scandal. Parnas is of Jewish-Ukrainian descent. In 2017, at the age of 18, Parnas completed both a diploma from Florida Atlantic University High School and a B.A. in political science and criminal justice at Florida Atlantic University. Despite not being old enough to vote, he campaigned door-to-door for Marco Rubio and Donald Trump. 

He graduated from George Washington University Law School, with honors, in 2020 at the age of 21. While in law school, Aaron won multiple awards for his oral advocacy skills including the Cohen & Cohen Mock Trial Award, and the Graduation Award for Excellence in Pre-Trial and Trial Advocacy. In 2019, Parnas worked as a summer intern at Greenberg Traurig, the former law firm of Giuliani. Prior to joining his current law firm, Aaron served as a law clerk at the United States District Court for the Middle District of Florida.

Career 
In 2020, Parnas published a memoir titled Trump First: How the President and His Associates Turned Their Backs on Me and My Family. This followed Parnas' father being implicated in a variety of criminal activities, in 2019, including involvement in illegal campaign fundraising and working to pressure the Ukrainian government into opening investigations into potential opponents of Trump. Parnas voted for and campaigned for Joe Biden in 2020.
Parnas currently works at a Washington, D.C. based law firm. He is also a Democratic digital strategist. In early 2021, Parnas began serving as the press secretary for the Miami-Dade Democratic Party.

In a February 24, 2022 interview, Parnas began posting TikTok videos expressing shock about the 2022 Russian invasion of Ukraine and published information about his relatives that were trying to evacuate Ukraine. Parnas's TikToks saw success and he became notable as a pro-Ukrainian TikToker.  He has since amassed more than 1 million followers on TikTok. He was one of several influencers to speak with President Joe Biden in an effort to combat disinformation about the Russo-Ukrainian crisis.

References

External links
 

Living people
Year of birth missing (living people)
Place of birth missing (living people)
21st-century American lawyers
Florida Atlantic University alumni
George Washington University Law School alumni
Lawyers from Miami
American TikTokers
21st-century American Jews
American people of Ukrainian-Jewish descent
Florida Democrats